MAF may refer to:

Military
 Myanmar Air Force
 Malaysian Armed Forces
 Marine Amphibious Force, a former name for Marine Expeditionary Force,  a type of U.S. Marine Corps task force

Organizations
 Majid Al Futtaim Group
 Move America Forward
 Mission Aviation Fellowship

Science
 MAF (gene)
 Minor allele frequency in genetics
 Methoxyacetylfentanyl, an opioid analgesic
 Macrophage-activating factor
 Moisture and Ash Free, a measure of moisture and ash content as used in ranking coals or the heat-content of wood
 Million acre-foot, MAF, a unit of volume commonly used in the United States in reference to large-scale water resources

Sports
 Malaysia Athletics Federation
 Metin-Ali-Feyyaz, Turkish football trio who constituted attacking line of Turkish sports club Beşiktaş J.K.
 Marc-André Fleury (born 1984), Canadian ice hockey goaltender in the National Hockey League

Technology
 Mass airflow sensor, used to find the mass flowrate of air entering a fuel-injected internal combustion engine
 MAFless Tuning, a method of operating the fuel injection system on a gasoline-powered motor vehicle whereby the mass airflow meter is removed
 Markranstädter Automobilfabrik, a German car-brand built from 1909 to 1923 in Markranstädt
 Mozilla Archive Format, a format for archiving web pages and also an add-on of the same name for Mozilla Firefox
 Magnetic field-assisted finishing
 Microsoft Access Form, a file format associated with Microsoft Access, bearing the file extension .maf

Other
 New Zealand Ministry of Agriculture and Forestry
 Saint Martin (France), ISO 3166-1 alpha-3 country code
 Midland International Airport, whose IATA code is MAF
 Michoud Assembly Facility, a NASA manufacturing facility 14 miles outside New Orleans, Louisiana